Acrocercops karachiella is a moth of the family Gracillariidae, known from Pakistan. It was described by H.G. Amsel in 1968.

References

karachiella
Moths of Asia
Moths described in 1968